A widow's peak is a V-shaped point in the hairline in the center of the forehead. Hair growth on the forehead is suppressed in a bilateral pair of periorbital fields. Without a widow's peak, these fields join in the middle of the forehead so as to give a hairline that runs straight across. A widow's peak results when the point of intersection on the forehead of the upper perimeters of these fields is lower than usual.

Definition
A widow's peak is a distinct point in the hairline in the center of the forehead;  there are varying degrees of the peak. Although it is commonly taught as an example of a dominant inherited trait, there are no scientific studies to support this.

Etymology

The term stems from the belief that hair growing to a point on the forehead – suggestive of the peak of a widow's hood – is an omen of early widowhood. The use of peak in relation to hair dates from 1833. The expression widow's peak dates from 1849. The use of peak may refer to the beak or bill of a headdress, particularly the distinctive hood with a pointed piece in front – a biquoquet – which widows wore as a hood of mourning dating from 1530. Another explanation for the origin of the phrase suggests that it may be related to the mourning caps worn as early as the 16th century. A mourning cap or 'Mary Stuart Cap' is a cap which features a very distinctive triangular fold of cloth in the middle of the forehead, creating an artificial widow's peak. The use of peak referring to a point in the cloth covering the forehead dates to at least 1509 when it appears in Alexander Barclay’s The Shyp of Folys:

And ye Jentyl wymen whome this lewde vice doth blynde Lased on the backe: your peakes set a loft.

Causes

Ely Guv Hintonith and M. Michael Cohen hypothesized the widow's peak hairline to be an anomaly that results from a lower-than-usual point of intersection of the bilateral periorbital fields of hair-growth suppression on the forehead. This can occur because the periorbital fields of hair-growth suppression are smaller than usual, or because they are more widely spaced. Wide spacing also explains the association between ocular hypertelorism – that is, the eyes being abnormally far apart – and widow's peak; this was suggested by findings in an unusual case of ocular hypertelorism in which surrounding scalp-hair growth was suppressed by an ectopic (displaced) eye. In some cases, Widow's peaks are a symptom of Donnai-Barrow syndrome, a rare genetic disorder caused by mutations in the LRP2 gene. Other genetic syndromes occasionally associated with widow's peaks include Waardenburg syndrome and Aarskog syndrome.

Widow's peaks are slightly more common among males, although in recent studies the difference has been found to not be statistically significant. Studies among the Isoko ethnic group in Nigeria found that 15.45% of males had a widow's peak present as compared to 16.36% of females.

Notable examples

People with natural widow's peaks include singers Damiano David, Alex Turner, Lauren Jauregui, Jack White, Harry Styles, Kat Bjelland, Rebecca Black, and Zayn Malik, six-time world Snooker champion, Ray Reardon (nickname Dracula), professional tennis player Taylor Fritz, actors Chris Hemsworth, Keanu Reeves, Kit Harington, Leonardo DiCaprio, John Travolta, Grace Kelly, Blake Lively, Fran Drescher, Rita Hayworth, Marilyn Monroe, Andy García, Colin Farrell, James Roday, 
Rekha, Luke Evans, and male model Hamza Ali Abbasi,
 as well as politicians Paul Ryan, Ronald Reagan, and Andrew Jackson.

A number of fictional people have a widow's peak. In film, this trait is often associated with a villain or antagonist; Count Dracula is an example. Eddie Munster – from the television program The Munsters – also had this distinctive hairline. Another villain depicted as having widow's peak hair is The Joker from Batman comic books and films. Namor, the Sub-Mariner has long held the feature. Vegeta from the Dragon Ball franchise is known for his widow's peak. Hannibal Lecter is repeatedly described as having one in the novels that feature his story. The original illustrations of Sherlock Holmes present the famed detective with a prominent widow's peak, as do all of Spider-Man co-creator Steve Ditko's drawings of Peter Parker, and a sketch of James Bond personally commissioned by the author Ian Fleming.  Pulp fiction hero Doc Savage also had this hair trait. Oberyn Martell from George R. R. Martin's A Song of Ice and Fire novels is described as having a prominent widow's peak.

Additionally, widow's peaks are shown to poll well for politicians. According to research by Shawn Rosenberg of the University of California-Irvine, "widow’s peaks (though more so on female candidates) were a clear positive. It was associated with being seen as more competent and with greater integrity".

See also
Hay hood, a barn architectural element sometimes called widow's peak

References

External links
 
 

Facial features
Human hair